Mount Morris Consolidated School District is a public school district in Genesee County in the U.S. state of Michigan and in the Genesee Intermediate School District.

High school

Athletics

References

External links
mtmorrisschools.org
MMHoops.com

School districts in Michigan
Education in Genesee County, Michigan